This is an incomplete list of gasoline engines designed by Maybach AG, manufactured by Maybach and other firms under licence, and fitted in various German tanks (fr:, de:) and half-tracks before and during World War II. Until the mid 1930s, German military vehicle manufacturers could source their power plants from a variety of engine makers; by October 1935 the design and manufacture of almost all tank and half-track engines was concentrated in one company, Maybach AG, located in Friedrichshafen on Lake Constance.

The firm designed and made a wide range of 4, 6, and 12-cylinder engines from 2.5 to 23 litres; these powered the basic chassis designs for approximately ten tank types (including tank hunters and assault guns), six half-track artillery tractor designs, plus two series of derived armoured personnel carriers. Maybach also designed a number of gearboxes fitted to these vehicles, made under licence by other manufacturers. Friedrichshafen was also home to the Zahnradfabrik (ZF) factory which made gearboxes for Panzer III, IV, and Panther tanks. Both Maybach and ZF (and Dornier) were originally subsidiaries of Luftschiffbau Zeppelin GmbH, which also had a factory in the town.

Maybach used various combinations of factory letter codes (discussed below) which specified the particular ancillaries to be supplied with each engine variant: the same basic model could be fitted in a number of vehicles, according to the original manufacturer's design requirements. For example, the basic 3.8 and 4.2 litre straight-6 engines (the NL38 and HL42) fitted in various half-tracks could be supplied in at least 9 different configurations, although every component was to be found in a single unified parts list.

However, as the war progressed, a number of problems hampered the German armaments production effort. The factory's inability to manufacture enough complete engines as well as a huge range of spare parts, meant that there was often a lack of both. Conflicts between the civilian Reich Ministry of Armaments and Munitions and the German Army led to a failure to set up an adequate distribution system, and consequent severe shortages of serviceable combat vehicles. In April 1944 an Allied bombing raid put the Maybach factory out of action for several months, and destroyed the ZF gearbox factory.

By the end of the war Maybach had produced over 140,000 engines and 30,000 semi-automatic transmissions for the German Wehrmacht.

Maybach history, 1935–1945
In order to rationalise Germany's military vehicle production, sweeping changes were made to its entire automotive industry. By late October 1935, Maybach had been designated the sole designer and manufacturer of tank and half-track engines for the army, with production later outsourced to other firms including its subsidiary Nordbau (Norddeutsche Motorenbau GmbH) in the south-eastern Berlin suburb of Niederschöneweide beside the River Spree.

Maybach AG made very few complete parts of its engines at all. Almost everything was bought in from other suppliers. Its main activity was precision machining of the castings and forgings of its own design, made by outside manufacturers, and producing complete assembled engines on a separate assembly line. In addition, machined pistons, piston rings, roller and ball bearings, carburettors (Solex), fuel pumps and complete electrical equipment (Bosch) were acquired as finished parts from outside sources.

Although a steady supply of spare parts is essential to an army in the field, the production of complete engines always took priority over providing spares. According to Albert Speer, Hitler himself never realised this importance: "One of his worst failings was that he simply did not understand the necessity for supplying the armies with sufficient spare parts."

Germany never achieved the industrial capacity needed to keep its military vehicles running efficiently: when the Russian campaign got underway, the deficiencies of the armaments industry and the organisation of maintenance depots became obvious. The German armed forces suffered from continual shortages of spare parts for tanks and half-tracks until the end of the war. When the first Tiger I tanks arrived in Russia in autumn 1942, there was only one spare engine and one transmission for every 10 tanks. A critical lack of spare parts meant that most of them were out of commission within a short period, sometimes for weeks on end. Despite various attempts at re-organisation, friction between the distribution systems of the German Army (das Heer) and the civilian Ministry of Armaments (and from 1944 the 'Rüstungsstab') often led to confrontation and inefficiency. Some of this can be blamed on Karl-Otto Saur of the Ministry of Armaments, whose ruthless drive for greater overall production figures tended to override the need for testing and durability concerns, and the manufacture of enough spare parts.

According to Stieler von Heydekampf, president of the Panzer Kommission from 1943, German tank production was at a major disadvantage throughout the war because the main firms involved were heavy equipment manufacturers. It would have been more effective if the programme had been given to Ford Germany and Opel (owned by General Motors) because of their real mass production experience, but this was not done because of their American associations.

Maybach's monopoly on engine production proved to be the bottleneck in German tank production. From 1942, after the German invasion of the Soviet Union, Maybach started dispersing its manufacturing activities, licensing eight other firms to manufacture its engines. Adler Werke in Frankfurt/Main built the HL42 from January 1942; Saurer Werke in Vienna, Krauss-Maffei (Munich), and Borgward in Bremen were licensed to build the HL62 & HL64; Maschinenfabrik Bahn Bedarf (MBB) in Nordhausen made the HL109, and also the HL120—along with Maybach's subsidiary Nordbau in Berlin and MAN in Nurnberg; and Auto Union in Chemnitz (Siegmar Werke) made HL230s, having tooled up from October 1943–March 1944. Maybach from August 1943 also organised 11 of its own dispersal machining sites located from a few miles away to some 60 miles distant; the finished parts were then sent to a designated factory for assembly. These precautions allowed manufacture of complete engines to take place away from Friedrichshafen. On Hitler's orders in March 1944, the extensive cellars below the town of Leitmeritz (now Litoměřice, Czech Republic) on the river Elbe were to be used for the anticipated assembly for HL120 and HL230 tank engines, in case a manufacturing plant were to be bombed.

Despite these precautions, by late 1943 there was still a severe shortage of spare tank engines. Rather than concentrate on proven designs, Maybach continued to bring out new, relatively untested models; the wide variety of engine types seriously hampered efforts to fix the multiple defects which Maybach engines developed under combat conditions. The extreme difficulty of stocking so many spares at the front, several thousand kilometres away from the factory, swiftly led to vehicles being unserviceable for combat. Because the armaments industry was already working at full capacity, it was not possible to completely replace obsolete models with new versions. Instead, the number of tank models and types within each series issued to the field forces increased steadily, which only made the maintenance and repair situation worse.

Severely damaged tanks from the Russian front were initially shipped back to Germany, or to the Nibelungenwerk or the Vienna Arsenal for repair; but the prospect of inevitable delays often meant that vehicles were instead cannibalised at the front for parts. Often when a new engine was delivered, there was little left except the hull of the tank it was intended for. Nevertheless, the maintenance crews did their best, often retrieving knocked-out tanks under considerable difficulties.

As the war progressed, new Maybach engines tended to be rushed into production, without adequate testing and improvement. As a result, they were viewed as unreliable (although this would be expected of any un-developed engine). All the 325 new Panther tanks delivered to Russia in early 1943 had to be returned because of serious defects in the steering; they were underpowered by the HL210 P30 engine, and its replacement, the HL230 P30 (which didn't arrive until late 1943) suffered from over-heating, fires in the engine compartment and blown gaskets.

By way of comparison, the Soviet Army used a single basic engine (the V-12 diesel Kharkiv V-2) to power the majority of its tanks – with a few modifications – starting with the BT-7M and its successor the T-34, producing  @ 1800 rpm in 1939; the SU-85 and SU-100; the KV-1 and KV-2 (600 hp with supercharging in 1939); and the IS-2, ISU-122 and ISU-152 and the T-10. Maybach didn't produce a more powerful acceptable engine until late 1943 with the HL230 P30.

Starting in March 1944, a series of Allied precision and area bombing raids put the Maybach factory out of action for several months. Those of 27/28 April and 20 July especially inflicted heavy damage on the plant. However, engine production continued at the various dispersed machining sites and manufacturers. If the various firms making Maybach motors under license had not been in a position to continue producing engines, the German Army's entire tank program would have been seriously jeopardised.

Although the German Army used various combat vehicles appropriated from other countries, they continued to be powered by their original engines. Maybach engines were fitted to the German fighting vehicles for which they had been designed.

General design
All Maybach engines which reached series production were gasoline four-stroke water-cooled designs. The firm's founder, Dr. Karl Maybach, had stated that "he was born water cooled and wanted to die water cooled."

Before the war the fuel industry had indicated that petroleum was going to be easier to produce than synthetic diesel, and development of gasoline engines was therefore favoured. By around 1943 the situation had turned around, but by then it was too late to change. Dr. Ferdinand Porsche had consistently pushed for air-cooled diesels, but his organisation's designs never functioned satisfactorily. The large Porsche engine of this type slated for the Ferdinand never worked, and two Maybach HL120s were fitted instead.

A number of Maybach motors shared the same basic design but had different engine sizes, the larger engines having bigger cylinders to increase the capacity. Similar engine designs had shared parts lists, e.g. the NL38 and HL42; the HL57 and HL62; and the HL108 and HL120.

The 6-cylinder Maybach engines used a single Solex 40 JFF II down-draught carburetor, and earlier V-12s used two. Later V-12s used Solex 52 JFFs. 

A hand-cranked inertia starter (Schwungkraftanlasser) was fitted to the V-12 engines to supplement the Bosch 24V electric starter motor (powered by two 12V batteries) in cold weather.

Nomenclature

DSO8
An exception to the detailed naming system described below is the Maybach DSO8 V-12 engine fitted to early Sd.Kfz. 8s. It was derived from the DS7 (i.e. Double-Six, 7 litres) fitted in the Maybach Zeppelin luxury car from 1929, a 7.0 litre (6,971 cc) V12 engine that produced 150 horsepower at 2,800 rpm, and from the later DS8 8-litre (bore x stroke=92*100 mm, 7977 cc, 486 cubic inches) which developed 200 bhp (149 kW; 203 PS) at 3200 rpm. The engine block and pistons were made of light aluminium alloy with cast iron liners. A 1938 Maybach Zeppelin DS8 also fitted with a Maybach Variorex vacuum shift eight-speed gearbox (both the first 8-speed and first 8-speed manual gearbox), sold at auction in 2012 for 1.3 million Euros.

John Milsom mentions two versions of the DSO8, one with a power output of 150 bhp fitted to the prototype DB ZD5 as early as 1931, and one of 200 bhp found in the early production Sd.Kfz. 8 (DB s 7) from 1934 to 1936. A DSO8 developing 155 PS @2600 rpm was also recommended for export models of the Panzer III MKA ("mittlerer Kampfwagen fur Ausland") in August 1937, since the proposed 200 PS Maybach HL76 was "slow to come into production", and may never have reached series production at all.

The DSO8 also powered three Swedish Stridsvagn m/31 prototypes in the early 1930s. A 150 hp DSO8 is also found in the Strv FM/31 Landsverk L-30 dating from 1931, examples of both are preserved in the Arsenalen Försvarsfordonsmuseum in Strängnäs, central Sweden.

Introduction
Maybach used a series of letter codes and numbers to identify specific engine models, namely:
 NL / HL – performance
 TU / TR – lubrication 
 K – clutch 
 R / RR – V-belt drive for compressor and/or radiator fans
 M – magneto ignition

Although these codes usually indicate what ancillary equipment was fitted at the factory (e.g. the HL42 TUKRRM and the HL57 TR), there are some exceptions, discussed below.

The individual engine number and its capacity, the model type, and year of manufacture are hand-stamped on each crankcase. On 6-cylinder models with magneto ignition, this information is found on the magneto housing: e.g.MOTOR Nr 730192
    4198 ccM.
   HL42 TUKRM
      1943 

And on the HL210:
Mot. Nr. 46302
 HL210P45

Performance
 NL = Normalleistung (normal performance motor)
 HL = Hochleistung (high performance motor)
This is followed (without space) by the approximate engine capacity (e.g. HL42 = approx. 4.2 litres.)

Compared to the NL motors, the HL (high performance) series had a higher compression ratio, which increased the power output. This advantage was somewhat lost when a mandatory requirement to run on lower-quality OZ 74 (74 octane) gasoline after October 1938 necessitated the compression ratio of the HL series to be lowered, achieved by fitting shorter pistons and a new cylinder head. This may partially explain the similar power outputs of engines with different capacities, shown in the table further below.

Lubrication
 TR = Trockensumpfschmierung (dry sump lubrication), generally fitted to tanks - because of low ground clearance - and to the Sd.Kfz. 10 and 250 half-tracks. There is no sump below the crankcase: the engine oil is contained in a reservoir on one side. On later V-12s there is a tunnel through the oil reservoir, through which the hand crank for the inertia starter passes, operated from the outside rear of the vehicle.

In a number of cases, especially the dry sump tank engines (e.g the HL108 TR), this is the complete designation of an engine: in other words, there is no factory-fitted clutch (K) attached to the engine; no extra drive belts driving a compressor (R) and/or dual fans (RR) on custom pulleys; ignition is achieved by a magneto driven off the camshaft rather fitted in its own housing (M); and no specific vehicular installation (P, S, or Z) is implied. 
 TU = Tiefer Unterteil ('deep lower part' i.e. wet sump), only fitted to some half-tracks. The sump generally has an inverted triangle shape, bolted to the underneath of the crankcase housing.

Most of the TU (wet sump) type engines were installed in half-track artillery tractors Sd.Kfz 6, 7, 8, 9 and 11, and were fitted with some or all of the ancillaries (K, R, or M). There appear, nevertheless, to be exceptions. For example, the HL57 TU was apparently only installed in some versions of the Sd.Kfz. 7, which was in fact fitted with a factory clutch, integral compressor and magneto. The extra equipment was fitted as standard and the extra letter codes were not included in the model number.

In addition, 'T' by itself has no meaning; it is always directly followed by either R or U, but 'R' in this position should not be confused with an (R) signifying a V-belt drive for a compressor (see below). Furthermore, in some sources engines may be referred to simply as e.g. "a Maybach HL 120 of 300 metric horsepower", which indicates that further information is needed to identify the particular model number.

Transmission
 K = Kupplung or Kupplungsgehäuse (clutch housing): a clutch is attached directly to the flywheel end of the crankshaft, generally driving a manual gearbox with 4 forward speeds and 1 reverse, plus a high/low reduction gearbox, giving 8 forward and 2 reverse ratios (4+1 x2). This type of transmission was fitted to all the half-tracks with a TU-type engine, and to early Panzer Is. The transmission could also have a rear power take-off (PTO) shaft fitted to power a winch; or turntables for either a gun, or crane on e.g. the Sd.Kfz. 9/1.  The Sd.Kfz. 10 had a unique arrangement with a conventional clutch attached to the engine driving a pre-selector Maybach 'Variorex' VG 102 128H gearbox. See also § Compressor below.

 If there is no factory-fitted clutch (K), this indicates a tank engine (except early Panzer Is). Instead, a horizontal cardan shaft connects the flywheel to a separate gearbox next to the driver. This could be a pneumatically-controlled, pre-selector Maybach-Variorex (e.g. certain Panzer IIIs and Stug III); or a synchromesh ZF 'Aphon' (e.g. later Panzer III and IVs); or a hydraulically-controlled Maybach-Olvar (e.g. Tiger I and II).
A 10-speed Maybach-Variorex SRG 328 145 gearbox was fitted in Panzer IIIs Ausf. E–G, operated by vacuum pressure generated by a compressor (R) - see next section. The main clutch is integral to the gearbox housing. (See also diagram on right.) 
Other tank gearboxes included the synchromesh ZF Aphon SSG 5x and 7x series gearboxes (the SSG 75 fitted in early Panzer IV had five forward gears and one reverse: the 76 and 77 had six forward and one reverse). The main clutch (LA 120 HD)  was bolted to the gearbox on the SSG 75, and incorporated into the main housing in the 77. The SSG 77 gearbox replaced the mechanically vulnerable Variorex in the Stug. III Ausf. C. Bigger tank engines (e.g. the HL230) used a hydraulically-controlled Maybach-Olvar gearbox such as the Olvar EG 40 12 16 (8 forward gears, 4 reverse), fitted to Tiger Is and IIs.
 Some half-track gearboxes also included a power take-off shaft (PTO) driving an external winch.

Compressor
Most of the half-track engines had a compressor fitted, to power various types of equipment (discussed below). In some cases the compressor was an integral part of the engine's design and not specifically indicated in the model number: in others, the compressor was an external belt-driven ancillary denoted by an (R) in the model number. 
 R = Riemenantrieb für Luftpresser (V-belt drive for air compressor), driven at the radiator end by a pulley with an extra groove. The compressor is connected to various types of equipment, including:
Panzer III Ausf. E–G, and Stug III Ausf. A (only 20 made)§ – Maybach Variorex SRG 328 145 pre-selector gearbox
Sd.Kfz. 10 and 250 – Variorex VG 102 128H pre-selector g/box
Sd.Kfz. 11 and 251 – air brakes on towed equipment (e.g. Pak 40 anti-tank gun)
Sd.Kfz. 6–9 – pneumatic foot/parking brake + towed equipment (e.g. 15 cm sIG 33 towed by the Sd.Kfz 7)
On certain Panzer IIIs, and Stug III, and on the Sd.Kfz. 10 with its derivative the Sd.Kfz. 250, the compressor provided the (reverse) pressure for a pneumatically-operated pre-selector gearbox. To shift gears, the pre-selector lever is set in the desired position or slot, and then the clutch pedal is depressed and released. The air inlet of the compressor is connected to the system, not the outlet: the compressor works "in reverse" to create a vacuum. Inside the Variorex gearbox, there are vacuum-actuated pistons with attached selector forks: these move dog clutches, which select the desired gearing.

On some engines (e.g. the NL38 TUK) the compressor was an integral part of the engine, driven by internal gears and mounted on top of the cam cover at the flywheel end. In similar fashion, on the HL 57 TU and 62 TUK the compressor was located in a gear-driven housing next to the clutch on the inlet side. On other models where the compressor was fitted as an ancillary (e.g. HL38 TUKR), it was mounted on one or other side of the engine, driven by an extra V-belt at the radiator end. Thus the lack of an 'R' in the model number doesn't necessarily mean that a compressor wasn't fitted.

 KR = Clutch and compressor: production versions of the Demag half-tracks, the Sd.Kfz. 10 (manufacturer type D7) and Sd.Kfz. 250 (D7p) were fitted with a Maybach SRG, type VG 102 128H, with 7 forward and 3 reverse gears. Although they worked on the same vacuum principle as the bigger tank pre-selector gearboxes (e.g. Variorex SRG 328 145, installed in Panzer III Ausf. E-G), these gearbox types had no integral clutch, and were much smaller than those fitted to tanks. The drive passed through a standard clutch attached to the engine via a cardan shaft into the gearbox: depressing and releasing the clutch pedal simultaneously disengaged the main clutch and actuated the vacuum pistons to engage the pre-selected gear ratio.
 KRR = Clutch, compressor, and extra belt drives for radiator fans: fitted to a number of Sd.Kfz. 251 variants, which had a different radiator from the unarmored Sd.Kfz. 11 on which it was based.  A triple V-belt pulley mounted at the top of the engine also drove the twin cooling fans mounted directly between the engine and the radiator.

Ignition
All Maybach engines used a Bosch 12-volt magneto for the ignition. There were two main types:
 Driven off the camshaft (or the camshaft pinion), located at the top of the engine at the flywheel end. This type of magneto can often be identified at the top of the engine at the flywheel end by a circular, slightly domed cover, and a tubular duct (sometimes corrugated) which fed the ignition leads out of sight behind an engine cover plate. This type of installation was part of the standard specification and not included in the model letters (e.g.HL98 TUK). This applies to some 6-cylinder models and all V-12s. On the HL210 the two magnetos are driven off the ends of the camshafts, and on the HL230 they are centrally located between the cylinder heads.
 M =  (impulse magneto ignition). Some 6-cylinder models had this type of magneto in its own housing, driven off the starter ring on the flywheel, located on the right-hand side. This type of installation is indicated with an (M) in the model number, e.g. HL42 TUKRM. A number of engines of the same basic design were first fitted with the camshaft-driven type and later with the  type (e.g. HL62 TR/TRM).
Most models were also fitted with a belt-driven Bosch generator/dynamo for charging the batteries for the 24-volt electric starter motor, lighting, etc. On 4- and 6-cylinder engines the generator was usually connected by a drive shaft to a separate coolant pump located close to the cylindrical oil cooler.

Installation
 P = Panzerkampfwageneinbau (tank installation?)
 Z = Zerstörereinbau (tank destroyer installation?)
 S = Schleppereinbau (military tractor installation?)

These letters were only used on some models, e.g. HL42 TRKMS, HL45 Z, HL157 P.

The HL230 P30 and P45 don't appear to fall into this category, being named according to their original project specification: the HL230 P30 was designed to be fitted in the Panther, whose prototype was the 30-ton class VK30.02; and the HL230 P45 went in the Tiger, whose final 45-ton class prototype was numbered VK45.01.

Examples
 NL38 TRKM = Normal performance 3.8 litre, dry sump, clutch, schanpper magneto (Panzer I Ausf. B)
 HL42 TUKRRM = High performance 4.2 litres, wet sump, clutch, belt-driven compressor, twin radiator fans, schnapper magneto (Sd.Kfz. 251)
 HL62 TR = High performance 6.2 litre, dry sump, no clutch (K), no external compressor (R), camshaft-driven magneto (no M) (some Panzer II)
 HL108 TUKRM = High performance 10.8 litre, wet sump, clutch, belt-driven compressor, schanpper magneto (Sd.Kfz. 9)
 HL120 TRM = High performance 12.0 litre, dry sump, no clutch (K), schanpper magneto (Panzer III)

Gallery

Lists of Maybach engines

Between 1934 and 1950, Maybach designed approximately 100 different types of HL engines, of which about 70 reached at least bench testing. Some were 'proof of concept' single-cylinder designs.

Fewer than twenty of these basic designs were actually manufactured as quantity series production engines, and are shown in the first table. Many these engines were manufactured in their thousands by Maybach and its licensed manufacturers.

The second table lists Maybach engines which, although fully functioning, were only made in small quantities and often assigned to projects in the VK series ("research/experimental fighting vehicle"). Others in the second list were intended for tanks and other AFVs which never even left the drawing board, the so-called 'Paper Panzers' such as the Entwicklung series, from de:, "development").

Table 1: Maybach WWII engines which reached series production

Table 2: Maybach research/test/experimental engines made in small quantities (under 100)

Development of the HL210 and HL230

 
A proposed replacement for the Panzer IV had been considered since around 1937. What became the Tiger tank went through a series of specifications, with the final revision (VK 4501) being made in May 1941. Only a month later, the German armies invading Russia encountered the superior T-34 and KV-1: by December 1941 a specification for a 30-ton medium tank (which became the Panther) had been proposed as an immediate response to the Soviet tank threat.

Development of the two tanks continued simultaneously: the Tiger prototype was demonstrated to Hitler on his birthday in April 1942, and the first of two Panther prototypes was ready in August 1942.

The weight of the Tiger had increased considerably since its inception, and although it was now considerably heavier than the Panther medium tank, Maybach proposed fitting almost exactly the same 21-litre V-12 650 hp engine in both tanks. To save weight, the cylinder block was cast in aluminium alloy, with cast iron liners. The pistons were made of low-expansion aluminium-silicon alloy with Si content of nearly 20%. The engine for the original 30-ton Panther project was the Maybach HL210 P30, while the 45-ton specification for the Tiger received the HL210 P45. The only visible difference was the arrangement of the coolant ducts exiting the cylinder heads, since the Panther and Tiger had different flows through their radiators.

Quantity series production of the PzKpfw VI Tiger (Ausf. H) with the HL210 P45 engine began in August 1942, and it is possible that production of the Panther's HL210 P30 was begun at much the same time. The first battalions to be equipped with the Tigers were the 502nd Heavy Panzer Battalion on the Eastern Front near Leningrad, and the 501st Heavy Panzer Battalion which was sent to Tunisia. Unfortunately, it swiftly became apparent that the Tiger was seriously underpowered, and the rush into production of the new engines meant that the inevitable design defects had not been ironed out. Nevertheless, when the new Tigers arrived in Russia, there was only one spare engine and one transmission for every 10 tanks. A critical lack of spare parts meant that most of them were out of commission within a short period.

The first PzKpfw V Panthers (Ausf. D) were similarly ill-fated; series production began in January 1943, but when they arrived in Russia in the spring the faults (including the steering and leaking engine gaskets) were so egregious that the entire batch had to be returned to Germany. A special plant for rebuilding the Panthers was established near Berlin.

In the meantime, Maybach re-designed the HL210, replacing the alloy cylinder block with a traditional cast-iron one. Although there was no space for a physically larger engine, the cylinders were capable of being bored out without compromising the engine's integrity. The new HL230 23-litre engines were installed from May 1943 in the latest production Panthers as the P30, and in Tigers as the P45. Although they produced 700PS @3,000 rpm, from November 1943 they were governed at the factory to 2,500 rpm to increase engine life, which limited them to the same 650 PS as the HL210.

Despite all the changes, the up-engined Panther Ausf. A with the HL230 P30 (which didn't arrive in Russia until late 1943) suffered from over-heating, fires in the engine compartment and blown head gaskets. The head gasket problem was solved in August 1943 by pressing copper rings into grooves to seal the head. A new design of piston was fitted to the HL230 P45 which reduced the compression ratio slightly. Some new and rebuilt motors from October had faulty bearings installed causing frequent failures: improved bearings were installed in new HL230 P45s from January 1944.

Maybach didn't separate the production statistics of the 210 from the 230. Altogether, production of both types amounted to 153 in 1942, 4,346 in 1943, and 1,785 HL230s up to April 1944. In late April 1944 an Allied bombing raid put the Maybach factory out of action for six months. Production was transferred to the Auto Union factory in Chemnitz, which delivered 219 HL230 engines to Henschel in 1944. A total of 4,366 HL230s from April for Panthers and Tigers were delivered from April 1944 to 1945.

Identifying HL210 and HL230 types
 HL210: three air filters; magnetos are located separately at the end of each camshaft; on the oil cooler side the oil filter sits at a relatively upright angle, approx. 70°.
 HL230: two air filters: magnetos are located centrally in a twin housing between the cylinder heads; oil filter sits at approx. 45°.
 P30: the twin cast iron hot coolant ducts are symmetrical and visually similar, with separate feeds to l.h and r.h. radiators..
 P45: the coolant ducts are siamesed into a single pipe leading to the r.h. radiator.

HL234

Maybach continued to develop increasingly powerful 4-stroke water-cooled gasoline-powered engines during the war. One such  which never reached series production was the HL234, a development of the HL230.

The intention was to develop a fuel-injected and supercharged engine, but only the fuel injection mechanism (by Bosch) was working by the end of the war.  The engine displaced approximately 23.4 litres, and the un-supercharged version was capable of developing 850 PS @2,800 rpm, with maximum torque of  @1,750 rpm, and 900 PS @3,000 rpm Only a few pilot fuel-injection engines were built. The fuel-injected and supercharged version (one engine completed) would hopefully deliver around 1200 PS.

The main supercharger was to have been driven by its own twin-cylinder supercharged 1 litre engine of 70 PS mounted in the V of the HL234 (where the carburetors were located in a normally-aspirated engine), but this part of the design was never completed. By April 1943 the crankshaft bearings and connecting rods from the HL230 had also been strengthened, and the direct fuel injection system was working - but the supercharger was not yet fully developed. Other improvements over the HL230 included water-cooled spark plugs; an improved intake manifold for better airflow; and improved exhaust manifold as well. Instead of coil-type valve springs the HL 234 used much stronger Belleville washers, which reduced valve opening times. Problems with rubber seals and copper [head] gaskets were solved by adopting designs used in the Rolls-Royce Merlin engine.

The first HL234  was planned to be delivered in early 1945 to the Kummersdorf proving ground and was proposed in January 1945 as an upgraded power plant for the Tiger II, but had not yet been tested in a tank by that date. It was also proposed for the Panther II at a later prototype stage, but the project was discontinued. Similarly, the E.50/E.75 tank series for which the engine was also intended were never built before the war's end, with only development of individual components taking place.

Maybach also developed a smaller 12-litre version on similar lines to the HL234. It weighed 600 kg, developing 500 PS without supercharger and 700 PS at 3,800 rpm supercharged, but like so many other German war-time projects, it never came to fruition.

Half-tracks
German WWII half-track prime mover numbering may appear not to be strictly logical: the two smallest vehicles were introduced after most of the larger artillery tractors were in production. In ascending order of engine size and therefore towing capacity, they were designed to tow the following:
 Sd.Kfz. 10 (1-ton), 3.7 cm PaK 36 & 5cm PaK 38, and SP 2cm Flak 30
 Sd.Kfz. 11 (3-ton), 7.5 cm Pak 40 & 41, 10.5 cm leFH 18 and 15 cm sIG 33, 7.5 cm Flak. L/60, standard and Nebelwerfer ammunition trailers
 Sd.Kfz. 6 (5-ton), 10.5 cm leFH 18, 7.5 cm Flak. L/60. Mainly used as engineer/Pioneer equipment and personnel carrier
 Sd.Kfz. 7 (8-ton), 8.8 cm Flak, 10 cm K.18, 15 cm sFH 18, 15 cm Kanone 18 (2 separate loads); SP for 3.7 cm Flak & 2cm Flakvierling
 Sd.Kfz. 8 (12-ton), 10.5 cm FlaK 38, 17 cm Kanone 18 and 21 cm Mörser 18 (2 separate loads)
 Sd.Kfz. 9 (18-ton), 24 cm Kanone 3 (5 separate loads), 35.5 cm Mörser (7 separate loads), 6 or 10-ton crane, or tank recovery

As Maybach designed new, more powerful engines, all these vehicle types received at least two and up to four different engine models during production of the latest batches. There remained the necessity of attempting to produce either spare parts or complete new engines, just to keep the older vehicles running.

See also
 Maybach HL230
 GT 101, BMW-based turboshaft engine project for German AFVs
 Maybach I and II, high command bunkers near Berlin

References
Notes

Citations

Bibliography

External links
 Photo gallery of various Maybach engine types at Fahrzeuge der Wehrmacht (in German), including NL38 TR, HL42 TRKM, HL54 TUKRM, HL62 TUK, HL85 TUKRM, HL90, HL108 TUKRM, HL120, HL230 P30 & P45, and fuel-injection HL295 fitted in post-war AMX-50 prototype

Engines